UFO Abduction is a 1989 American found-footage science fiction horror film written, produced, and directed by Dean Alioto. Despite ongoing misinformation, the film has never been titled "The McPherson Tape". The film centers on a family who are terrorized by extraterrestrials during a birthday celebration.

Plot 
The film begins with a brief introduction that purports the film as legitimate and explains that it is one of the strongest pieces of evidence for extraterrestrial life.

On the evening of October 8, 1983, the Van Heese family gathers in the Connecticut mountains to celebrate the birthday of 5-year-old Michelle. The family consists of Ma Van Heese (Shirly McCalla), her three sons Eric (Tommy Giavocchini), Jason (Patrick Kelley), and Michael (Dean Alioto), Eric’s wife Jamie (Christine Staples), his daughter Michelle (Laura Tomas), and Jason’s girlfriend Renee (Stacey Shulman). Michael uses his hand-held camera to record the night’s events, much to the amusement and irritation of his family.

The early evening passes relatively uneventfully as the family celebrates; however, after briefly turning off the lights for Michelle’s birthday candles, they discover that they will not turn back on. Eric, Jason, and Michael inspect the breaker outside, and are startled by a red light that passes overhead. Curious, they walk to the neighboring property to investigate. While walking, they reveal through their discussion that their mother has become an alcoholic since their father’s death, despite their attempts to help her.

The three eventually come across what appears to be an extraterrestrial spacecraft in the woods, and are shocked to see three diminutive aliens standing outside. However, they flee after the aliens notice their lights. Returning to the house, they alert their family, lock the doors, and load shotguns, but are divided on whether they should remain in the house or leave. They see more red lights through a window, and theorize that the aliens may have left. After calming down, they attempt to continue the party, noticing that all their watches have stopped.

With the evening getting late, they conclude the festivities, and Eric and his family attempt to leave. Soon after, Jason and Michael come across one of Michelle’s drawings, which resembles one of the aliens they saw in the woods. They rush Eric and his family back inside, and are terrified when the aliens attempt to enter the house through the windows and chimney. Eric manages to shoot and seemingly kill one after hearing it on the roof, which appears to dissuade the aliens from further attempts. He brings the alien’s body inside and places it in a back room, despite the others’ protests.

After debating, Eric and Jason plan to retrieve Eric’s truck and bring it by the front door so the family can escape. They do not return, so the others go after them but only find the empty truck and their shotguns. They flee back to the house, dragging a hysterical Jamie. Inside, they come to the hopeful conclusion that Eric and Jason must have gone for help, and attempt to occupy themselves by playing cards. Soon after, they narrowly prevent Renee and Ma from opening the front door in separate attempts. Both have no memory of the incident and claim they heard a voice in their head telling them to open the door. Michael also discovers the alien’s body is gone and the back door is open. After securing the house once more and turning up the radio to block out voices, the others finally convince Michael to put down his camera and resume their card game. From its position across the room, the still-recording camera violently glitches and records the three aliens emerging from the back room. The tape ends as the aliens close in on the unaware family.

The film claims that the Van Heeses’ whereabouts are still unknown and that viewers should contact the producers if they have any information.

Cast 
The Van Heese family and aliens:

 Tommy Giavocchini as Eric Van Heese
 Patrick Kelley as Jason Van Heese
 Shirly McCalla as Ma Van Heese 
 Stacey Shulman as Renee Reynolds 
 Christine Staples as Jamie Van Heese 
 Laura Tomas as Michelle Van Heese (the birthday girl) 
 Dean Alioto as Michael Van Heese (cinematographer) 
 Ginny Kleker as Alien 1
 Kay Parten as Alien 2 
 Rose Schneider as Alien 3

Production 
UFO Abduction was written, directed, filmed, and produced by Dean Alioto, through IndieSyndicate Productions. The film is presented as found footage, portraying the final recordings and last known whereabouts of a Connecticut family named the Van Heeses just before they are abducted by extraterrestrials. Dean Alioto produced the no budget film using $6,500 from the company IndieSyndicate Productions.

Release 
UFO Abduction had a limited release through Axiom Films. Designed to appear to be a genuine 1983 home video recording, the film depicts the alien abduction of a Connecticut family as they celebrate their relative's 5th birthday. The materials for UFO Abduction were destroyed in a warehouse fire at the distribution company, precluding the film's wide-release on video. In 2018, the film was first officially released to DVD and Digital download through the director. It was re-released in 2020 by AGFA on Blu-ray with a new upscaled transfer of the original, presumed lost, 3/4" tape. The release also includes the 2017 director's cut of the film, as well as a commentary track by the director.

Remake 
Dean Alioto and Paul Chitlik remade UFO Abduction in 1998, with a much larger budget and professional actors, under the original title The McPherson Tape which was changed by the network executives to Alien Abduction: Incident in Lake County.

References

External links
 
 
 

Alien abduction films
1989 films
1989 horror films
1980s science fiction horror films
1989 thriller films
American independent films
American science fiction horror films
Camcorder films
Found footage films
Films set in 1983
Films set in Connecticut
1980s English-language films
1980s American films
.